Cerekwica  (German: Zerkwitz, until 1887: Cerekwice) is a village in the administrative district of Gmina Jaraczewo, within Jarocin County, Greater Poland Voivodeship, in west-central Poland.

The village has a population of 230.

References

Villages in Jarocin County